Mervyn George Grell (18 December 1899 – 11 January 1976) was a West Indian cricketer who played in one Test in 1930.

Mervyn Grell served with the Honourable Artillery Company in Italy during World War I, and with the Local Trinidad Regiment in World War II.

A hard-hitting lower-order batsman and a medium-pace bowler, Mervyn Grell played only a handful of first-class matches between 1930 and 1937.  The first two were for Trinidad against the visiting MCC in 1929-30. On his debut, played at Port-of-Spain in January 1930, he scored 40 and 54 batting at number 9 and 8 respectively; he top-scored in Trinidad's first innings and was their second-highest scorer in the second. He also took the wickets of Nigel Haig and Les Townsend in the visitors' second innings, both players caught by wicketkeeper Errol Hunte. In his second match a few days later, also against MCC in Port-of-Spain, Grell was asked to captain Trinidad, and followed a duck in the first innings with the top score of the match in the second, 34 not out, when he led a rearguard action that almost brought victory.

On the basis of his three good scores against the English team, and because he lived in Port-of Spain, he was selected to play in the Second Test against England, played at Port-of-Spain in February 1930.  He scored 21 and 13 in West Indies' defeat.

In all first-class matches, Grell recorded his highest score, 74 not out, in his last, played at Bourda, Georgetown, against British Guiana in 1937.

He was also an international football referee.

References

External links
 
 Mervyn Grell at CricketArchive

1899 births
1976 deaths
West Indies Test cricketers
Trinidad and Tobago cricketers
Honourable Artillery Company soldiers